The Alabama Historical Association (est. 1947) of Alabama, United States, is an historical society that aims to "discover, procure, preserve, and diffuse whatever may relate to the natural, civil, literary, cultural, economic, ecclesiastical, and political history of the state of Alabama." James Frederick Sulzby (1905-1988) served as president of the organization from 1947 through 1949. In 1948 the group launched the quarterly journal Alabama Review. It also oversees a program of historical markers throughout the state. Membership meetings are held at least annually.

As of 2022, the president of AHA is Jim Bagget of the Birmingham Public Library.

See also
 Alabama Department of Archives and History (est. 1901), government agency
 Alabama Historical Commission (est. 1966), government agency
 Alabama Historical Society (1850-1905)

References

Bibliography
 
 
 
  (About historical markers)

External links
 Official site

State historical societies of the United States
1947 establishments in Alabama
Organizations based in Alabama
History of Alabama